Rabbi Dovid Barkin (born David Barkin; October 24, 1945 – December 20, 2006) was an American Rosh Yeshiva of the famed Telshe yeshiva in Cleveland, Ohio.

Rabbi Barkin was born in Chicago to Rabbi and Mrs. Kalmen and Golda Barkin, Lithuanian Jews. He married Miriam Bloch, the daughter of Telzer Rosh Yeshiva, Rabbi Eliyahu Meir Bloch. As the Rosh Yeshiva of Telshe, Rabbi Barkin's lectures on the Talmud became quite popular and they have been uploaded to the internet and made available to the general public.

In 2001, Rabbi Dovid Barkin was amongst the eulogizers at the funeral of Rabbi Mordechai Gifter.
He died on December 20, 2006 . His funeral was broadcast worldwide live via conference call for all of his students to participate . On the 30-day anniversary of his death, Rabbi Barkin was eulogized in Lakewood, NJ by Rabbi Malkiel Kotler and Rabbi Yitzchok Sorotzkin.

References

External links 

RebDovidBarkin.com (audio lectures on the Talmud)
Rabbi Dovid Barkin's Lectures on Kol HaLoshon

2006 deaths
Rosh yeshivas
1945 births